Tucker Powell Smith (January 29, 1898June 25, 1970) was an American academic and political activist. He was an economics professor at Brookwood Labor College and Olivet College. He was the Socialist Party of America's nominee for Vice President in the 1948 United States presidential election alongside presidential nominee Norman Thomas.

Background
Circa 1930, Smith graduated from the University of Missouri with a bachelor's degree and master's degree in political science. He was a member of Phi Beta Kappa, Delta Sigma Rho, and Alpha Zeta Pi.

Career
In the 1930s, Smith was a faculty member at Brookwood Labor College.  On June 5, 1933, with the departure of A.J. Muste, Smith was appointed director of the college until it closed in 1937.

Smith was a long-time pacifist.  He was a member of the Committee on Militarism in Education and the Fellowship of Reconciliation (both major pacifist organizations during and after World War I).

In 1948, Smith was selected as the Socialist vice presidential candidate to run along with Norman Thomas. The 1948 Socialist ticket garnered 139,569 votes. In 1930 Tucker was the Socialist candidate for U.S. Representative from New York 2nd District. Tucker finished third of four candidates with 6,144 votes for 3.8% of the total vote.

On January 8, 1949, Smith was dismissed from his position at Olivet College because he had organized a teachers' union following the dismissal of colleague and professor of political science T. Barton Aikely.  In May 1949 Socialist Party dinner, New York University philosophy professor Sidney Hook attacked Smith's dismissal, arguing that teachers should be judged on merit only by their peers.

References

1898 births
1970 deaths
Socialist Party of America politicians from New York (state)
People from Eaton County, Michigan
Socialist Party of America vice presidential nominees
University of Missouri alumni
American pacifists
Brookwood Labor College faculty
Olivet College faculty
Economists from Michigan